Nikolai Nikolayevich Organov (– 5 May 1982) was a Soviet politician and statesman, Chairman of the Presidium of the Supreme Soviet of the RSFSR (1959–62). Member of the Bureau of the Central Committee of the CPSU for the RSFSR (1961-1962). He was a member of the special NKVD troika of the USSR.

Biography 
Born into a working-class family. Since 1916, a telegraph line repair worker. In 1919-1923 served in the Red Army.

From 1924 secretary of the county committee of the Komsomol. He joined the Russian Communist Party(b) in 1925. Then he held the positions of chairman of the city executive committee, secretary of the district committee, head of the department of the regional committee, regional committee.

1934-1937 1st Secretary of the Nekouzsky District Committee of the All-Union Communist Party of Bolsheviks (Ivanovo Industrial - Yaroslavl Region). In 1937, Acting 2nd Secretary of the Yaroslavl Regional Committee. This period was marked by joining the special troika, created by order of the NKVD of the USSR dated July 30, 1937 No. 00447, and active participation in the Stalinist repressions.

Since 1943, secretary of the Primorsky Regional Committee of the All-Union Communist Party of Bolsheviks. In 1948 he graduated from the Higher Party School under the Central Committee of the All-Union Communist Party of Bolsheviks (in absentia). In 1947-1952 1st Secretary of the Primorsky Regional Committee of the All-Union Communist Party of Bolsheviks. In 1952-1958 1st Secretary of the Krasnoyarsk Regional Committee of the CPSU (b) - CPSU. In 1958-1959 Deputy Chairman of the Council of Ministers of the RSFSR. In 1959-1962 Chairman of the Presidium of the Supreme Soviet of the RSFSR (elected on November 26, 1959, at the second session of the Supreme Soviet of the RSFSR of the 5th convocation). He was a member of the Bureau of the Central Committee of the CPSU for the RSFSR (October 31, 1961 - November 23, 1962).

In 1963-1967 he was Ambassador Extraordinary and Plenipotentiary of the USSR to Bulgaria. Since 1967, head of the department of the Central Committee of the CPSU. In 1967-1973 Chairman of the commission for travel abroad under the Central Committee of the CPSU.

Deputy of the Supreme Soviet of the USSR of the III-VIII convocations (1950-1970).

Retired since 1973. He died on 5 May 1982 in Moscow, and was buried in the Troyekurovskoye Cemetery.

Awards 

 3 Orders of Lenin

References 

Fifth convocation members of the Supreme Soviet of the Soviet Union
Third convocation members of the Supreme Soviet of the Soviet Union
Fourth convocation members of the Supreme Soviet of the Soviet Union
Sixth convocation members of the Supreme Soviet of the Soviet Union
Eighth convocation members of the Supreme Soviet of the Soviet Union
Heads of state of the Russian Soviet Federative Socialist Republic
Central Committee of the Communist Party of the Soviet Union members
Ambassadors of the Soviet Union to Bulgaria
Soviet diplomats
Recipients of the Order of the Red Banner of Labour
Recipients of the Order of Lenin
Burials in Troyekurovskoye Cemetery
1982 deaths
1901 births